György Ivánkai (born 10 June 1937) is a Hungarian speed skater. He competed at the 1964 Winter Olympics and the 1968 Winter Olympics.

References

1937 births
Living people
Hungarian male speed skaters
Olympic speed skaters of Hungary
Speed skaters at the 1964 Winter Olympics
Speed skaters at the 1968 Winter Olympics
Speed skaters from Budapest